Howell Washington Runnels, Sr. was a Texan politician who served as the 6th and 7th representative for Texas House of Representatives, District 1.

Life
Runnels was born on March 31, 1823. In 1842, his family immigrated to Texas, including Howell's 3 brothers, Hardin, Edmond, and Hiram. They all assumed leading positions in the Texas state government. Runnels eventually married someone Martha Caroline Adams on October 1, 1859, in Harrison, Texas.

In the 1870 census, Runnels was listed as a store clerk in Boston, Texas. He was also listed with his wife and 5 children. Sometime in 1876, Runnels moved to Texarkana, Bowie County, Texas, where he lived for the remainder of his life. He was buried in Rose Hill Cemetery, in Texarkana, Texas.

Politics
He served as the representative for District 1 of the Texas House of Representatives from November 21, 1855 - November 7, 1859.

References

1823 births
1895 deaths
Members of the Texas House of Representatives
19th-century American politicians